Elections to the Moray Council were held on 1 May 2003, the same day as the other Scottish local government elections and the Scottish Parliament general election.

Election results

Ward results

References

2003
2003 Scottish local elections
21st century in Moray